Geraldine James, OBE (born 6 July 1950) is an English actress.

Early life and family
James was born in Maidenhead, Berkshire, to a cardiologist father and an alcoholic mother, who had been a nurse. She failed her 11 plus exam, so was educated at Downe House, a girls' independent school in Newbury, Berkshire, where she was known as Gerry Thomas. Embarrassed by her simple surname, James used the grander-sounding double-barrelled name of Vaughan-Thomas while at school.

After graduating from the Drama Centre London in 1973, she began her career in repertory theatre. On 17 January 1977, she met her husband, Joseph Blatchley, at a party.

Acting
James has been nominated four times for the BAFTA TV Award for Best Actress; for Dummy (1977), The Jewel in the Crown (1984), Band of Gold (1995) and The Sins (2000). For her role as Portia in the 1989 Broadway revival of The Merchant of Venice, she was nominated for the Tony Award for Best Actress in a Play and won the Drama Desk Award for Outstanding Actress in a Play. She also won the Volpi Cup for Best Actress at the 1989 Venice Film Festival for She's Been Away. Her film credits include Gandhi (1982), The Tall Guy (1989), Sherlock Holmes (2009), Alice in Wonderland (2010), The Girl with the Dragon Tattoo (2011), and 45 Years (2015). Since 2017, she has starred in the Netflix series Anne with an E as Marilla Cuthbert, and in the 2019 film Downton Abbey as Queen Mary.

Theatre director Peter Hall said that James ranks amongst the great English classical actresses.

Credits

Film appearances
The Dumb Waiter (1979) as Sally
Bloody Kids (1980) as Ritchie's Wife
Sweet William (1980) as Pamela
Gandhi (1982) as Mirabehn
Freedom Fighter (1988) as Krista Donner
The Tall Guy (1989) as Carmen
The Wolves of Willoughby Chase (1989) as Mrs. Gertrude Brisket
Prince of Shadows (1991) as Rebecca Osorio
If Looks Could Kill – Teen Agent, (1991) as Vendetta Galante
The Bridge (1992) as Mrs Todd
Words Upon the Window Pane (1994) as Mrs. Henderson
Moll Flanders (1996) as Edna
The Man Who Knew Too Little (1997) as Dr.  Ludmilla Kropotkin
The Luzhin Defense  (2000) as Vera
Lover's Prayer (2001) as Mother
An Angel for May (2002)
Calendar Girls (2003) as Marie
Northanger Abbey (2007) as the narrator
Sherlock Holmes (2009) as Mrs Hudson
Alice in Wonderland (2010) as Lady Ascot
Made in Dagenham (2010) as Connie
The Girl with the Dragon Tattoo (2011) as Cecilia Vanger
Arthur (2011) as Vivienne Bach
Sherlock Holmes: A Game of Shadows (2011) as Mrs Hudson
45 Years (2015) as Lena
Alice Through the Looking Glass (2016) as Lady Ascot
Rogue One (2016) as Jaldine Gerams (Blue 3)
Daphne (2017)
Anne with an E (2017) as Marilla Cuthbert
Megan Leavey  (2017) as The Veterinarian
Beast (2017)
Downton Abbey (2019) as Mary of Teck
 Benediction (2021)

Music appearances
Human. :II: Nature. (2020)

Radio appearances

Television appearances
The Sweeney: Pay Off  (1976)  as Shirley Glass
Dummy (1977) as Sandra X
Shoestring (1979) Nine tenths of the law.
The History Man (1981) as Barbara Kirk
I Remember Nelson (1982) as Emma Hamilton
The Jewel in the Crown (1984) as Sarah Layton
Blott on the Landscape (1985) as Lady Maud Lynchwood
 Echoes (1988) as Angela O'Hara
Inspector Morse: Who Killed Harry Field (1991) as Helen Field
A Doll's House (1992) as Kristine Linde
Band of Gold (1995–1997) as Rose Garrety
Kavanagh QC (1995–1999) as Eleanor Harker QC
Rebecca (1997) as Beatrice
Little Britain as Mother of Harvey Pincher (cameo)
The Sins (2000) as Gloria Green
State of Play (2003) as Yvonne Shaps
Hex (2004) as Lilith Hughes
He Knew He Was Right (2004) as Lady Rowley
Agatha Christie's Poirot – After the Funeral, (2005)  as Helen Abernethie
The Amazing Mrs Pritchard (2006) as Hilary Rees-Benson
A Harlot's Progress (2006)
Ancient Rome: The Rise and Fall of an Empire (2006) as Cornelia
The Last Enemy (2008) as Barbara Turney
Heist (2008) as Joanna
Midsomer Murders (2010) Series 13, episode 8, "Fit for Murder" as Miranda Bedford
Thirteen Steps Down (2012) as Gwendolyn
Utopia (2013) as Milner 
Black Work (2015) as Chief Constable Carolyn Jarecki
The Five (2016) as Julia Wells
Anne with an E (2017–2019) as Marilla Cuthbert (adaptation of Anne of Green Gables)
Back to Life (2019-2021) as Caroline Matteson
The Beast Must Die (2021) as Joy
This Town (TBA)

Theatre appearances
Portia opposite Dustin Hoffman in the London and Broadway productions of The Merchant of Venice by William Shakespeare.
Hedda Gabler at the Royal Exchange, Manchester in 1993.

Awards

Honours
 James was made an Officer of the Order of the British Empire (OBE) in the 2003 Queen's Birthday Honours.

References

External links

"The Jewel That is James" – Interview by Jeremy Taylor for bmi Voyager October 2007
Q&A with Geraldine James in the Guardian

1950 births
English stage actresses
English film actresses
English television actresses
Drama Desk Award winners
Volpi Cup for Best Actress winners
People from Maidenhead
People educated at Downe House School
Alumni of the Drama Centre London
Officers of the Order of the British Empire
Living people
20th-century English actresses
21st-century English actresses
Actresses from Berkshire
Best Supporting Actress in a Drama Series Canadian Screen Award winners
English radio actresses